The People's Football Stadium is a football stadium located in Lyari, a neighbourhood in Karachi, Sindh, Pakistan. It is owned by the Karachi Metropolitan Corporation, formerly City District Government of Karachi. It has a capacity of 40,000. 

Stadium is part of a sports complex which also houses a boxing arena having capacity of 5000 spectators, and Gymnasium sports complex where indoor sports like volleyball, badminton and basketball are contested.

Overview
The stadium was built in 1988, and opened on 9 December 1995. In 1999, when Prime Minister Benazir Bhutto came into power, new floodlights imported from France worth PKR 30.7 million were installed, to enable evening matches to take place. The Pakistan national football team moved to the Peoples Football Stadium from the Railway Stadium in Lahore.

Major matches 
The stadium, hosted the South Asian Football Federation Championship in 2005. It also hosted all the matches in the inaugural Karachi Football League and Geo Super Football League in 2007.

The group stages of 2012 KPT Challenge Cup was held in this stadium along with KPT Football Stadium. The stadium is currently used for the final phase of 2018–19 Pakistan Premier League.

See also
 List of stadiums by capacity
 List of stadiums in Pakistan
 List of cricket grounds in Pakistan
 List of sports venues in Karachi
 List of sports venues in Lahore
 List of sports venues in Faisalabad
 List of football stadiums
 Pakistan Football Federation
 Football in Pakistan

References

External links 
 

Football venues in Pakistan
Stadiums in Karachi
K-Electric F.C.